José de Jesús Arellano Alcocer (born 8 May 1973) is a Mexican former professional footballer who played as a winger and a wanted fugitive. He last played for Monterrey in the Primera División de México.

Biography
Arellano, nicknamed "El Cabrito," is known for his speed, dribbling and passing abilities, Arellano has played an important role for the Mexico national team for many years and has led his country to victories in several occasions. He was one of the players responsible for the erratic comebacks made by Mexico in the World Cup groups stage at France'98. Known as the "Super-Substitute", Arellano was brought in the field, in the late stages of the match, by Mexico's now retired national coach, Manuel Lapuente and help his country come back from seemingly impossible situations to either draw or win the games.

After his debut with CF Monterrey, he tried his luck with the "All Mexican Team", Club Deportivo Guadalajara during the 1998 Fall season. However, Arellano found his success with the "Rayados de Monterrey" club, helping them win the 2003 Clausura championship title in the La Primera División.

In the FIFA World Cup in Korea-Japan 2002, Arellano made a less of an impact as a substitute. He was among the starting eleven for three matches, where he helped his country reach the "Elimination Round of 16" of the tournament. In total, he has amassed 70 caps for Mexico, scoring seven times and was among 23 players selected by coach Ricardo La Volpe, to play in the 2006 FIFA World Cup. Arellano played one match throughout the tournament and only appeared in the 2nd half as a substitute player in a 0–0 draw, against Angola.

Jesus Arellano is the seventh Mexican player and the first one to be born in Monterrey to play three World Cups: France 98, Korea-Japan 2002 and Germany 2006.

Rape allegations and arrest
In January 2017, Arellano was accused of raping his 16 year old niece. The minor had provided testimony to authorities and had undergone physical examinations that prompted an investigation. Arellano was arrested in his home in Monterrey on May 4, 2019, after being on the run for over a year. Arellano was in jail for 5 days before being ordered free by a judge due to lack of sufficient evidence. On December 19, 2019, the case was reopened.

In December 2020, Arellano had only his lawyers present in the court to represent him. Authorities issued an arrest warrant the following month for Arellano. As of April 2022, his whereabouts remain unknown.

Honours
Monterrey
Mexican Primera División: Clausura 2003, Apertura 2009, Apertura 2010
InterLiga: 2010
CONCACAF Champions League: 2010–11
CONCACAF Cup Winners Cup: 1993

Mexico
FIFA Confederations Cup: 1999
CONCACAF Gold Cup: 2003

Individual
CONCACAF Gold Cup Most Valuable Player: 2003
CONCACAF Gold Cup Best XI: 2003

Career statistics

International goals
Scores and results list Mexico's goal tally first.

References

External links

Jesús Arellano Article (In Spanish)
Profile and Statistics (In Spanish)
Football Database.com provides Jesús Arellano's profile and stats

1973 births
Fugitives wanted by Mexico
Living people
Footballers from Nuevo León
C.F. Monterrey players
C.D. Guadalajara footballers
Liga MX players
2006 FIFA World Cup players
2004 Copa América players
2003 CONCACAF Gold Cup players
2002 FIFA World Cup players
2000 CONCACAF Gold Cup players
1999 FIFA Confederations Cup players
1998 FIFA World Cup players
FIFA Confederations Cup-winning players
CONCACAF Gold Cup-winning players
Footballers at the 1996 Summer Olympics
Olympic footballers of Mexico
Mexico international footballers
2001 Copa América players
Sportspeople from Monterrey
Association football wingers
Pan American Games medalists in football
Pan American Games silver medalists for Mexico
Medalists at the 1995 Pan American Games
Footballers at the 1995 Pan American Games
Mexican footballers